In economy of the Soviet Union and economy of Russia, Technical Control Departments (OTK) were and are in charge of quality assurance of production and services.

In the late Soviet Union the OTK existed in all socialist enterprises.

See also
State Quality Mark of the USSR
State Acceptance of Production

References

Economy of the Soviet Union
Economy of Russia
Quality assurance

ru:Отдел технического контроля